Yotsuba Arena Tokachi is an arena in Obihiro, Hokkaido, Japan.

References

Basketball venues in Japan
Indoor arenas in Japan
Levanga Hokkaido
Sports venues in Hokkaido
Obihiro, Hokkaido
Sports venues completed in 1972
1972 establishments in Japan